Mathematical Medicine and Biology is an academic journal published by Oxford University Press on behalf of the Institute of Mathematics and its Applications. The Journal publishes articles addressing topics in medicine and biology with mathematical content.

Impact factor 
Mathematical Medicine and Biology received an impact factor of 1.854 in 2020.

Editors 
The editors-in-chief are Oliver E. Jensen (University of Manchester), John R. King (University of Nottingham), and  James P. Keener (University of Utah).

References

External links 
 Journal homepage
 Submission website
 Institute of Mathematics and its Applications
 Editorial Board

Mathematical and theoretical biology journals